David Hargreaves (27 August 1954 – 6 August 2018) was an English professional footballer who played for Accrington Stanley and Blackburn Rovers, as a striker.

Early and personal life
Hargreaves was born in Accrington. He was nicknamed "Haggis".

Career
Hargreaves began his career with Accrington Stanley in 1974, and scored 56 goals in 44 appearances in the 1975–76 season. He signed for Blackburn Rovers in December 1977, spending two "injury-blighted" seasons, and only making two League appearances for the club. He returned to Accrington Stanley, staying there until 1985. He scored a total of 309 goals in 322 games for them, a club record.

Later life and death
Hargreaves died on 6 August 2018, at the age of 63.

References

1954 births
2018 deaths
English footballers
Accrington Stanley F.C. players
Blackburn Rovers F.C. players
English Football League players
Association football forwards
People from Accrington